Tom Tuohy is an American attorney, author and philanthropist. He is the founder of Dreams for Kids, a nonprofit international youth empowerment organization and of Tuohy Law Offices. He is the author of two books, Kiss of a Dolphin, 2006, and the updated version, Dreams for Kids, Changing the World...One Person at a Time, 2010.

Early life
Tom Tuohy was born June 17, 1957, in Austin  on the Westside of Chicago. He lived with his parents and three siblings during the infamous "White Flight" era. At the age of 8 years old, Tuohy became the son of a single mother raising 4 young children on her own. His father, Patrick Jr., abandoned his family, leaving his mother, Mrs. Patricia Tuohy, to raise him and his three older siblings.

Education and Career
At the age of 19, he began college at DePaul University and worked as a law clerk. He graduated with a B.S. in marketing in 1979, and went on to receive his Juris Doctor from DePaul University College of Law. In 1981, Tuohy received a certificate in international law from the University of Cambridge. He is also a Kellogg School of Northwestern University Executive Scholar and was selected for the Executive Program for Nonprofit Leaders of Stanford University Graduate School of Business Center for Social Innovation.

During his freshman year in college, Jesse White, Illinois Secretary of State, and founder of the 60 year Jesse White Tumbling Team walked into the office where Tuohy was working. The Jesse White Tumbling Team is a gymnastics and tutoring organization that has worked with tens of thousands of youth from poverty-stricken areas of Chicago. Mr. White showed Tuohy how children were living in underprivileged areas of Chicago, specifically Cabrini Green. Mr. White became his mentor and lifelong friend after introducing Tuohy to the poverty of Cabrini Green and inspiring his future philanthropic work.
Tuohy serves on the Jesse White Tumbling Team and Jesse White Scholars executive boards.  Mr. White has served as the Chairman of the Dreams for Kids Advisory Board from its inception.

Tuohy Law Offices 

In 1982, Tuohy founded Tuohy & Associates, now known as Tuohy Law Offices in Chicago. From 1983 to 1984 Tuohy served as Special Assistant Attorney General of Illinois. Tuohy's law firm assists clients in various areas from estate planning to personal injury. Mr. Tuohy is ranked in the top 5% of all attorneys in the United States for 14 consecutive years by Martindale Hubbell, rating him A/V, the highest rating for legal ability and ethical standards. Martindale Hubbell has been providing attorney ratings for more than 138 years, being the oldest and largest lawyer peer review rating system, basing their ratings on Legal Knowledge, Analytic Capabilities, Judgment, Communication Ability and Legal Experience. Avvo has also awarded Mr. Tuohy with a 10/10 score, its highest rating of superb, and the BBB has rated Tuohy Law Offices with an A+. In 2015, Mr. Tuohy was selected as a member of the Nations Top 1% by the  National Association of Distinguished Counsel.

He was awarded the Prestigious Highest Rating (AV) for Legal Skill and Competence for 20 consecutive years and is sworn into the U.S. Supreme Court Bar in 1990. He served as Special Assistant Attorney General of Illinois from 1983 to 1984. Tom is an Adjunct Professor of Social Entrepreneurship at Kellstadt Graduate School of Business of DePaul University. He is a graduate of DePaul University, DePaul Law School and Kellogg School of Business at Northwestern, as an Executive Scholar. In 2011, Tom attended Stanford Graduate School of Business to share best practices on social innovation with 46 corporate and nonprofit leaders from 14 countries. He has spoken at Northwestern, DePaul, Stanford, TEDX, and companies such as Advocate Health Care, Blue Cross, Athletico, Federal Reserve, National Press Club, KIN Global, and World Chicago.

Comprehensive Benefits of America, LLC 

In 2016, Tuohy founded Comprehensive Benefits of America, LLC ' in Chicago, a social enterprise that provides financial wellness benefits for gig economy workers, labor unions, associations, and credit unions customers.

 Philanthropic work: Dreams for Kids 

Tom Tuohy, founded Dreams for Kids in 1989 at the request of his mother, Patricia Tuohy. In December 1989, Tuohy received a phone call from Ms. Clara Kirk of Clara’s House''. Clara's House is a homeless shelter for women and children in the neighborhood of Englewood, Chicago, where 43% of residents live below the poverty level. Dreams for Kids began its community outreach work on December 24, 1989, at Clara's House. Today, Dreams for Kids provides empowerment and social entrepreneurship training to underserved youth, giving them opportunities to make a difference in the lives of others, by helping them turn their ideas into reality and helping them make an impact.

In January 2022, Dreams for Kids merged with UrbanX Learning and became the flagship organization that features GCE Lab School and Learning Lab. The organization cultivates global citizens ready to meet the challenges of the 21st Century, through real-world experience and project learning to foster a diverse community of students who use the city as a classroom to develop skills and knowledge necessary to courageously take action locally and globally.

Featured 

 2013, American Family Insurance profile of Tom Tuohy
 2013, Interview.
 2012, Chicago Lawyer Magazine, feature of Tom Tuohy 
 2014, Guerin Prep, Distinguished Alumni, Walter Davenport Award 
 2019, Park Ridge Herald-Advocate, feature, Tom Tuohy Park Ridge Resident founded Dreams for Kids  
 2019, Interview, ABC Chicago, Nonprofit Dreams for Kids Turns Students into Entrepreneurs

References 

Stanford University people
American non-fiction writers
Writers from Chicago
Youth activists
DePaul University College of Law alumni
DePaul University alumni
Kellogg School of Management alumni
Illinois lawyers
American activists
Living people
1957 births